An auto body technician, automotive body technician, auto body repairer or  automotive body repairer is a professional who repairs and refinishes automotive vehicle bodies and straightens vehicle chassis. The technician restores a vehicle to its original look and fixes some mechanical components to strict manufacturing standards.

When a vehicle has been involved in a collision, it is the task of the auto body technician to restore it to industrial standards. Every accident is different so the technician must be familiar with complex mechanical components and how they work. The autobody repairer needs professional expertise to diagnose the damage to the vehicle and then use a variety of tools and machinery tools, including welding skills, to make the repair. Technicians need a solid knowledge of the range of metals, composites, and plastics used in the manufacture of vehicles in order to refurbish them to a roadworthy condition.

Most training is on the job, and in the U.S., technicians may obtain credentials through the National Institute of Automotive Service Excellence.

References

External links 
Autobody/Collision Repair
Autobody repairer
 
Industrial occupations
Mechanics (trade)
Technicians